Sandra Petrignani (born July 9, 1952) is an Italian journalist and writer.

She was born in Piacenza and received a literature degree from the University of Rome. Piacenza worked as a journalist, becoming an editor for Il Messaggero in 1987. In the same year, she won the Elsa Morante Prize for her novel Navigazioni di Circe. In 1989, she became editor for Panorama. Her short story collection Poche storie was a finalist for the Viareggio Prize in 1993. La scrittrice abita qui, published in 2002, was a finalist for the Strega Prize.

Selected works 
 Il catalogo dei giocattoli (1988), short stories
 Come cadono i fulmini (1991), novel
 Vecchi (1994), short stories
 Ultima India (1996), travel narrative
 Come fratello e sorella (1998), novel
 Dopo cena (1999), radio script
 Care presenze (2004), novel.

References 

1952 births
Living people
Italian women novelists
Italian women journalists
People from Piacenza
Italian women short story writers
20th-century Italian women writers
20th-century Italian novelists
21st-century Italian women writers
21st-century Italian novelists
20th-century Italian short story writers
21st-century Italian short story writers